Torreya is a genus of conifers comprising six or seven species placed in the family Taxaceae, though sometimes formerly placed in Cephalotaxaceae. Four species are native to eastern Asia; the other two are native to North America.  They are small to medium-sized evergreen trees reaching 5–20 m, rarely 25 m, tall.  Common names include nutmeg yew.

The genus is one example of the Arcto-Tertiary Geoflora in paleoecology. The pattern of highly disjunct distribution of geographic ranges of the species within such a genus spans temperate plant zones of continents in the Northern Hemisphere. This geographic pattern is attributed to genus origins in much warmer times of the Tertiary Period, when zones of temperate climate were found in poleward latitudes whereby land connections facilitated range expansions and migrations of plants between Asia and North America and sometimes between Europe and North America.

The leaves are spirally arranged on the shoots, but twisted at the base to lie in two flat ranks; they are linear, 2–8 cm long and 3–4 mm broad, hard in texture, with a sharp spine tip.

Torreya can be monoecious,  dioecious, or subdioecious (documented in Japanese Torreya and Florida Torreya). When monoecious, the male and female cones are often on different branches. The male (pollen) cones are 5–8 mm long, grouped in lines along the underside of a shoot. The female (seed) cones are single or grouped two to eight together on a short stem; minute at first, they mature in about 18 months to a drupe-like structure with the single large nut-like seed 2–4 cm long surrounded by a fleshy covering, green to purple at full maturity. In some species, notably the Japanese Torreya nucifera ('kaya'), and unusually for members of  Taxaceae, the seed is edible. Natural dispersal is thought to be aided by squirrels which bury the seeds for a winter food source; any seeds left uneaten are then able to germinate.

The genus is named after the American botanist John Torrey.

Fossil record

†Torreya clarnensis has been described from Middle Eocene fossils found in the Clarno Formation of Central Oregon, United States. Leafy branch fossils of †Torreya bilinica are known from Oligocene strata of Zichov near Bílina, Czech Republic, early Miocene deposits of Güvem central Anatolia, Turkey and late Miocene deposits of Spain. A single Torreya nucifera needle leaf is known from a late Miocene deposit in Abkhazia. More complete records of Torreya nucifera are known from Pliocene deposits of France.

Fossil pollen of genus Torreya and other genera within Taxaceae is generally deemed indistinguishable, one from another, and also from genera within families Taxodiaceae and Cupressaceae. Therefore, it is generally difficult to support past presence or absence of such genera in geographic locales where macrofossil plant material is rare or absent, even if substantial pollen (as in Quaternary bogs) is available.

Adaptive growth forms of this subcanopy genus

Species within this genus are all adapted to establish and grow slowly as subcanopy woody plants in forest habitats of moderate to dense shade. Stems will lean in very shady conditions, with branches and additional stems arising from the root crown growing more horizontally than vertically. If and when a canopy opening occurs, upward growth will be stimulated and even the leaf form and orientation will shift.

Seed production occurs on female branches (and trees) only in the presence of direct sunlight. Therefore, wild trees tended and planted trees cultivated for local or market seed consumption in Asia (usually, Torreya grandis) will have their surroundings managed accordingly through human intervention.

Species

References

Gymnosperm Database: Torreya
Native Conifers of North America: Torreya
Pinetum.org: photos of Torreya californica 
Pinetum.org: photos of Torreya nucifera
Proposals for Torreya taxifolia re-establishment
Torreya State Park (Florida)

 
Conifer genera